Paul Van Hyer (June 2, 1926 – January 22, 2018) was a professor of Chinese History at Brigham Young University (BYU) and the founder of the Asian Studies Program at that institution. He was also a key figure in the growth of the Church of Jesus Christ of Latter-day Saints (LDS Church) in Taiwan.

Biography
Hyer was born in Ogden, Utah.  During World War II, Hyer served in the United States Navy in the Pacific Theatre.  As a young man Hyer served as an LDS missionary in the Japanese mission located in Hawaii from 1946 to 1948.  While in Hawaii, Hyer set up a system to train missionaries in the Japanese language in an organized manner.

Hyer received his BA in history from BYU in 1951, followed by an MA in Asian history and Asian Social Institutions from the University of California, Berkeley in 1953 and a Ph.D. in Asian History, also from UC Berkeley, in 1961.

Hyer wrote the book A Mongolian Living Buddha which was a biography of Kanjurwa Khutughtu along with Sechin Jagchid.  Hyer also wrote Mongolia's Culture and Society with Sechin.

Besides his long period as a professor at BYU, Hyer also taught for three years in China.  
Hyer has also published several articles on the history of Inner Mongolia within the People's Republic of China as well as on Japanese-Tibetan relations and Lamanist Buddhism in Japan.  He also contributed an article on the prospects for the LDS Church in Asia to the first volume of Dialogue: A Journal of Mormon Thought.

Besides living in China and Taiwan, Hyer and his family also lived for a time in Japan.

From 1982 to 1985 Hyer served as president of the LDS Church's Taiwan Taipei Mission.  From 1988 to 1990 he served as president of the Taipei Taiwan Temple.  During the time between these two positions in Taiwan, Hyer served as bishop of a BYU ward. Later Hyer was involved in the negotiations leading to the LDS Church getting recognition in Mongolia.

Hyer and first wife, Harriett Johns Hyer, had eight children and 36 grandchildren. Harriet died on July 2, 1990, while she was serving as matron of the Taipei Taiwan Temple. He was remarried to Karen Emily Claus, also a professor at BYU, who taught Business Ethics and Public Administration at the Marriott School of Management. They were married at the Salt Lake Temple on March 27, 1991, by Marion D. Hanks, Hyer's World War II companion and long-time friend.

Hyer has also served as president of the International Society, an organization of professionals who are members of the LDS Church that works to promote the programs of the LDS Church and BYU on an international basis.

Notes

References
David M. Kennedy Center bio
Deseret News, June 18, 1988
Karen Hyer's congressional campaign website
Taiwan Today article that mentions Hyer and his time as mission president
obituary of Hyer

External links
Paul Hyer faculty and family papers, MSS 6650 at L. Tom Perry Special Collections, Brigham Young University

1926 births
People from Ogden, Utah
American leaders of the Church of Jesus Christ of Latter-day Saints
Mormon missionaries in Hawaii
Brigham Young University alumni
University of California, Berkeley alumni
Brigham Young University faculty
Mission presidents (LDS Church)
Temple presidents and matrons (LDS Church)
2018 deaths
American Mormon missionaries in Taiwan
American Mormon missionaries in the United States
American expatriates in China
American expatriates in Japan
Latter Day Saints from Utah
Latter Day Saints from California